Fourth stanza, explaining how Jesus was born of Mary to save sinners:
Since he was of woman born,
God saved women;
And he was born a man
To save men.

O Maria, Deu maire ("O Mary, mother of God") is an Old Occitan song, a hymn to the Virgin Mary, unique in being both the only song from the Saint Martial school (the chantry of the Abbey of Saint Martial at Limoges) that is entirely in the vernacular (having no Latin stanza or refrain) and the only medieval Occitan song with extant musical notation for all its (twelve) stanzas. It dates to the 1090s and is preserved in MS f. lat. 1139 of the Bibliothèque nationale de France. It has been translated into English.

A liturgical song, O Maria was designed to communicate sacred truth to the people in a language they could understand, although usually this was done through a mixture of Latin and vernacular verses. The melody of the piece basically repeats for each stanza with only minor variations. The later songs of the troubadours, composed in the same style, were never transcribed with more than one stanza of music. It has been suggested that, like O Maria, subsequent stanzas were melodically similar with only minor variations. Similarities have been drawn between the music of O Maria and that of a ninth-century hymn to the Virgin, Ave maris stella ("Hail, star of the sea"), and also between O Maria and Reis glorios, verais lums e clardatz ("Glorious King, true light and brilliance"), an alba by the troubadour Guiraut de Bornelh (fl.c.1200). The latter may be a contrafactum or just a metrical imitation, although its words cannot be presumed to have any similar religious significance.

Notes

Marian hymns
Old Occitan literature
Medieval compositions